Devereux is a Norman surname found frequently in Ireland, Wales, England and around the English-speaking world. Saint Devereux Church in Hereford, United Kingdom is also named Saint Dubricius and is dedicated to the 6th century clergyman Saint Dubricius from Hereford, suggesting that the name is a Norman French rendering of Dubricius or the saint's Welsh name Dyfrig. In Ireland, the name is associated with Wexford, where the Cambro-Normans first invaded from Pembrokeshire, Wales in 1170. Devereux is more probably the Anglo-Norman form of D'Evreux / Devreux, meaning d'Évreux ("from Évreux", a town in Normandy, France). Anglo-Norman develops regularly a svarabakhti vowel /e/ between /v/ and /r/, such as in overi (French ouvrit "opened"), or livere (French livre "book").<ref>Jacques Allières, La formation de la langue française, coll. Que sais-je ?, Presses universitaires de France, 1982, p. 121.</ref> Dubricius is called Dubrice in French and Dyfrig would have given *Difry / *Dufry in French and *Difery / *Dufery in Anglo-Norman, and St. Devereux is probably a mistranslation after the surname Devereux. The French variant is Devreux, which unlike Devereux is found within Normandy and France themselves.

The similar names Devereaux and Deveraux are alternate spellings of the surname resulting from the various ways of pronouncing it – the placename is pronounced "Dev-ruh", and the surname may be pronounced "Dever-o", "Dever-oo", "Dever-ooks", "Dev-erah", "Dev-rah", "Dev-ruh", or "Dev-rix" (Wexford).

People
Count of Évreux, title of nobility at the origin of the name
Elizabeth Devereux-Rochester (1917–1983), British female spy
George Devereux (1908–1985), Austro-Hungarian ethnologist and psychoanalyst (born in Lugoj, nowadays part of Romania)
Helena Devereux (1885–1975), American educator and founder of the Devereux Foundation
James Devereux (1903–1988), U.S. Marine Corps General and politician
Jim Devereux (1885–1936), Australian rugby league footballer
John Devereux (disambiguation)
Lillie Devereux Blake (1833–1913), American feminist
Marie Devereux (1940–2019), British actress
Nicholas Devereux (1791–1855), Irish-American banker, trustee, and western New York landowner
General Ricardo Wall y Devereux (1694–1777), Spanish General and Prime Minister of the 18th-century
Richard Devereux (disambiguation)
Robert Devereux, 2nd Earl of Essex (1565–1601), military hero and royal favourite, executed for treason
Robert Devereux, 3rd Earl of Essex (1591–1646), son of Robert Devereux, courtier and soldier
Robin Devereux, 19th Viscount Hereford (born 1975), an English peer and premier viscount
Sean Devereux (1964–1993), English-born educator known for his support of food aid in Liberia and opposition to child soldier conscription, and activist in Somalia. Murdered by Somali warlords in 1993.
Colonel Wallace C. Devereux (1893–1952) CBE, F.R.Ae.S., metallurgist and founder of High Duty Alloys Ltd.
Walter Devereux (disambiguation) is a name shared by several members of the same family including the 1st Viscount Hereford (c.1490–1558) and the 1st Earl of Essex (1541–1576)
William Devereux, Baron Devereux of Lyonshall (c.1244–1314), a Marcher Lord in the time of Edward I and Edward II of England.

Organizations
Devereux Foundation, U.S. non-profit organization founded by Helena Devereux
Devereux Glenholme School, Connecticut

Places
Devereux (Herefordshire), lost village in the United Kingdom
Devereux, Georgia, a community in the United States
Devereux Creek, Queensland, a small locality on the east coast of Australia
St Devereux (Herefordshire), church and parish 6 miles south of Hereford, originally dedicated to the Welsh Saint Dyfrig, Bishop of Ergyng

See alsoRoberto Devereux'', tragic opera by Gaetano Donizetti, loosely based on Robert Devereux, 2nd Earl of Essex

References

French-language surnames
Surnames of Norman origin